The 2009 Ulster Grand Prix incorporating the Dundrod 150 National Road Races took place between Wednesday 12 August and Saturday 15 August 2009 on the 7.401 mile Dundrod Circuit, County Antrim, Northern Ireland. Six races were held with Ian Hutchinson, Ryan Farquhar, Guy Martin, William Dunlop (two wins) and Conor Cummins sharing the victories. Farquhar also took a class win in the Supertwins.

Race results

Race 1; 2009 1000cc Superstock race final standings
Saturday 18 August 2009 6 laps – 44.406 miles Dundrod Circuit

Fastest Lap and new lap record: Ian Hutchinson, 3' 24.770 130.117 mph on lap 6

Race 2; 2009 600cc Supersport race final standings
Saturday 18 August 2009 7 laps – 51.807 miles Dundrod Circuit

Fastest Lap: Ian Lougher, 3' 29.949 126.907 mph on lap 6

Race 6; 2009 UGP Supporters Club Superbike race final standings
Saturday 18 August 2009 7 laps – 51.807 miles Dundrod Circuit

Fastest Lap: Gary Johnson, 3' 21.181 132.438 mph on lap 5

See also
 North West 200
 Isle of Man TT
 Manx Grand Prix

Sources

External links
 Official website
 Map of the Dundrod Circuit

2009
2009 in British motorsport
2009 in Northern Ireland sport
August 2009 sports events in the United Kingdom